Otto Karvinen (born 8 April 1990) is a Finnish professional ice hockey player. He is currently playing for Kärpät of the Finnish Liiga.

Karvinen made his Liiga debut playing with TPS during the 2014-15 Liiga season.

References

External links

1990 births
Living people
Jokipojat players
Kokkolan Hermes players
Oulun Kärpät players
Rovaniemen Kiekko players
HC TPS players
Vaasan Sport players
Finnish ice hockey forwards
People from Kerava
Sportspeople from Uusimaa